Andrew Wylie (February 25, 1814 – August 1, 1905) was an Associate Justice of the Supreme Court of the District of Columbia.

Education and career
Born in Canonsburg, Pennsylvania, Wylie was the eldest son of Andrew Wylie first President of Indiana University. Wylie attended Transylvania University and Indiana University Bloomington, graduating from the latter in 1832. He studied law with Walter Forward, and was admitted to the bar in 1837.  He practiced in Pittsburgh, Pennsylvania, from 1837 to 1848, serving at some point on the Pittsburgh City Council and acting in 1845 as Pittsburgh city attorney. In 1848, he moved his practice to Alexandria, Virginia, until about 1861, and thereafter to Washington, D.C., until 1863.

Federal judicial service
Wylie was nominated by President Lincoln to the Supreme Court of the District of Columbia on March 10, 1863, and was confirmed by the Senate on March 12, 1863. The Senate voted to reconsider the confirmation on March 13, 1863, with no subsequent Senate vote. His nomination expired on March 14, 1863, with the sine die adjournment of the special session of the 38th United States Congress.

Wylie received a recess appointment from President Abraham Lincoln on March 18, 1863, to the Supreme Court of the District of Columbia (now the United States District Court for the District of Columbia), to a new Associate Justice seat authorized by 12 Stat. 762. He was nominated to the same position by President Lincoln on January 5, 1864. He was confirmed by the United States Senate on January 20, 1864, and received his commission the same day. His service terminated on May 1, 1885, due to his retirement.

Later career and death
Following his retirement from the federal bench, Wylie resumed private practice in Washington, D.C., from 1885 to 1905. He died on August 1, 1905, in Washington, D.C. He was buried at Oak Hill Cemetery.

References

External links
Andrew Wylie, Jr. Family Collection, 1821–1945 at the Wylie House Museum, Bloomington, Indiana.
Wylie family collection, 1822-1990, bulk 1840-1900 at the Indiana University Archives.

Sources
 

1814 births
1905 deaths
People from Canonsburg, Pennsylvania
American people of Scotch-Irish descent
Judges of the United States District Court for the District of Columbia
United States federal judges appointed by Abraham Lincoln
19th-century American judges
Pennsylvania city council members
United States federal judges admitted to the practice of law by reading law
Burials at Oak Hill Cemetery (Washington, D.C.)